Robert Jaskulski (1926-2002) was a member of the Ohio House of Representatives.

Democratic Party members of the Ohio House of Representatives
1926 births
2002 deaths
20th-century American politicians